Mutual is a town in Woodward County, Oklahoma, United States. The population was 61 at the 2010 census. Incorporated in 1908, the town suffered under the agricultural depression after World War I and saw only minimal growth during the 1970s and 1980s.

Geography
Mutual is located at  (36.229816, -99.167704), approximately 19 miles southeast of Woodward, the county seat.

History
A "Mutual" post office was designated on June 4, 1895. The town was incorporated in 1908. In 1910, the town had a two churches, a bank, a feed mill, a machine shop, and a dealer in poultry and dairy products. The town also had a hotel early on.

The town fared well until the post World War I agricultural depression and the construction of U.S. Highway 270, meant to bypass the town. The town continued to decline until petroleum exploration and production in the 1970s and 1980s gave it a short boost. Mutual ended the 20th century with a half dozen businesses and 76 residents, some of whom commute to Woodward or Seiling for work.

Demographics

As of the census of 2010, there were 61 people, 28 households, and 17 families residing in the town. There were 36 housing units at an average density of 136.4 per square mile (52.7/km2). The racial makeup of the town was 90.2% White, 6.6% Native American, 0% Asian, 0% from other races, and 3.3% from two or more races. Hispanic or Latino of any race were 8.2% of the population.

There were 28 households, out of which 35.7% had children under the age of 18 living with them, 50% were married couples living together, 10.7% had a female householder with no husband present, and 39.3% were non-families. 39.3% of all households were made up of individuals, and 21.5% had someone living alone who was 65 years of age or older. The average household size was 2.18 and the average family size was 2.94.

In the town, the population was spread out, with 26.2% under the age of 18, 8.2% from 18 to 24, 27.9% from 25 to 44, 14.8% from 45 to 64, and 9.8% who were 65 years of age or older. The median age was 37.8 years. For every 100 females, there were 103.3 males. For every 100 females age 18 and over, there were 80.0 males.

The median income for a household in the town was $47,250, and the median income for a family was $49,472. The per capita income for the town was $24,408. None of the population was living below the poverty line.

References

Towns in Oklahoma
Towns in Woodward County, Oklahoma